This is a list of Mississippi Civil War Confederate Units, or military units from the state of Mississippi which fought for the Confederacy in the American Civil War. The list of Union Mississippi units is shown separately.

Confederate Army

Infantry

 1st (Johnston's) Infantry
 1st (Patton's) Infantry (Army of 10,000)
 1st (Percy's) Infantry (Army of 10,000)
 2nd Infantry
 2nd (Davidson's) Infantry (Army of 10,000)
 2nd Mississippi Infantry (Army of 10,000)
 3rd Infantry 
 3rd Infantry (Army of 10,000)
 4th Infantry
 5th Infantry
 6th Infantry
 7th Infantry
 8th Infantry
 9th Infantry
 10th Infantry

 11th Infantry
University Grays (Company A)
 12th Infantry 
 13th Infantry 
 14th (Consolidated) Infantry
 14th Infantry 
 15th (Consolidated) Infantry
 15th Infantry 
 16th Infantry
 17th Infantry
 18th Infantry 
 19th Infantry
 20th Infantry 
 21st Infantry
 22nd Infantry 
 23rd Infantry
 24th Infantry 
 25th Infantry (2nd Confederate)
 26th Infantry 
 27th Infantry
 29th Infantry 
 30th Infantry 
 31st Infantry 
 32nd Infantry 
 33rd Infantry 
 34th Infantry 
 35th Infantry 
 36th Infantry
 37th Infantry
 39th Infantry 
 40th Infantry 
 41st Infantry 
 42nd Infantry
 43rd Infantry
 44th Infantry 
 45th Infantry
 46th Infantry 
 48th Infantry
 1st Battalion, Infantry (Army of 10,000)
 2nd Battalion, Infantry
 3rd Battalion, Infantry
 5th Battalion, Infantry
 7th Battalion, Infantry
 8th Battalion, Infantry
 37th Battalion, Infantry
 Comfort's Company, Infantry
 Cooper's Company, Infantry
 Lewis' Company, Infantry
 Red's Company, Infantry (Red Rebels)

Sharpshooters
 1st Battalion, Sharp Shooters
 9th Battalion Sharp Shooters
 15th Battalion, Sharp Shooters

Cavalry

 Jeff. Davis Legion
 1st (Wirt Adams's/Wood's) Cavalry 
 1st (Lindsay's/Pinson's) Cavalry
 2nd Cavalry
 3rd (McGuirk's) Cavalry
 4th Cavalry
 5th Cavalry
 6th Cavalry
 7th Cavalry. Organized 3/1/1863 from 1st (Falkner's) Regiment, Partisan Rangers (see below).
 8th Cavalry
 9th Cavalry
 10th Cavalry
 11th (Ashcraft's) Cavalry 
 11th (Consolidated) Cavalry 
 11th (Perrin's) Cavalry
 12th Cavalry
 18th Cavalry 
 28th Cavalry 
 38th Cavalry
 Ham's Regiment, Cavalry
 Power's Regiment, Cavalry
 Yerger's Regiment, Cavalry
 1st (Miller's) Battalion, Cavalry
 3rd (Ashcraft's) Battalion, Cavalry
 4th Battalion, Cavalry
 6th Battalion, Cavalry
 17th Battalion, Cavalry
 24th Battalion, Cavalry
 Garland's Battalion, Cavalry
 Hughes' Battalion, Cavalry
 Stockdale's Battalion, Cavalry 
 Street's Battalion, Cavalry
 Abbott's Company, Cavalry 
 Bowen's Company (Chulahoma Cavalry)
 Buck's Company, Cavalry
 Duncan's Company (Tishomingo Rangers), Cavalry 
 Dunn's Company (Mississippi Rangers), Cavalry
 Garley's Company (Yazoo Rangers), Cavalry 
 Gibson's Company, Cavalry
 Hamer's Company (Salem Cavalry) 
 Knox's Company (Stonewall Rangers), Cavalry
 Polk's Independent Company (Polk Rangers), Cavalry 
 Russell's Company, Cavalry
 Semple's Company, Cavalry
 Shelby's Company (Bolivar Greys), Cavalry
 Vivion's Company, Cavalry
 William's Company, Cavalry

American Indian battalion
 1st Choctaw Battalion, Cavalry & Infantry

Artillery

 1st Light Artillery Regiment
 14th Battalion, Light Artillery
 Bradford's Company (Confederate Guards Artillery)
 Byrne's Battery, Artillery
 Cook's Company, Horse Artillery 
 Cowan's Battery, Co. G, 1st Miss. Light Artillery Regiment
 Culbertson's Battery, Light Artillery 
 Darden's Battery, Light Artillery (Jefferson Flying Artillery)
 English's Company, Light Artillery
 Graves' Company, Light Artillery (Issaquena Artillery)
 Hoskins' Battery, Light Artillery (Brookhaven Light Artillery)
 Kittrell's Company (Wesson Artillery), Artillery
 Lomax's Company, Light Artillery
 Merrin's Battery, Light Artillery
 Pettus Flying Artillery, Light Artillery a/k/a Hudson's Battery and later sometimes Hoole's Battery
 Richards' Company, Light Artillery (Madison Light Artillery)
 Roberts' Company (Seven Stars Artillery), Artillery
 Stanford's Company, Light Artillery
 Swett's Company, Light Artillery (Warren Light Artillery)
 Smith's/Turner's Battery, Light Artillery
 Yates' Battery, Light Artillery

Militia
 4th Cavalry, Militia
 Hinds County Militia

State Troops

Infantry
 1st Infantry, State Troops, 1864
 1st (Foote's) Infantry (State Troops)
 1st (King's) Infantry (State Troops)
 2nd (Quinn's) Infantry (State Troops)
 2nd Infantry, State Troops, 30 days, 1864
 3rd Infantry (State Troops)
 4th Infantry (State Troops)
 5th Infantry (State Troops)
 1st Battalion, State Troops, Infantry, 12 months, 1862–63
 1st Battalion, State Troops, Infantry, 30 days, 1864
 2nd Battalion, Infantry (State Troops)
 3rd Battalion, Infantry (State Troops)

Cavalry
 2nd State Cavalry
 1st (McNair's) Battalion, Cavalry (State Troops)
 1st (Montgomery's) Battalion, Cavalry (State Troops)
 2nd (Harris') Battalion, State Cavalry
 3rd (Cooper's) Battalion, State Cavalry
 Davenport's Battalion, Cavalry (State Troops)
 Stubb's Battalion, State Cavalry
 Gamblin's Company, Cavalry (State Troops)
 Grace's Company, Cavalry (State Troops)

Reserves
 3rd Battalion, Reserves

Infantry
 Berry's Company, Infantry (Reserves)

Cavalry
 1st Cavalry Reserves
 2nd Cavalry Reserves
 3rd Cavalry Reserves
 2nd Battalion Cavalry Reserves
 3rd Battalion, Cavalry Reserves
 Butler's Company, Cavalry Reserves
 Mitchell's Company, Cavalry Reserves

Partisans
 1st (Falkner's) Regiment, Partisan Rangers. Organized in April 1862; temporarily disbanded 11/15/1862. Reorganized 3/1/1863 as 7th Mississippi Cavalry (see above).
 2nd (Ballentine's) Regiment, Partisan Rangers 
 Armistead's Company, Partisan Rangers
 Rhodes' Company, Partisan Rangers, Cavalry
 Smyth's Company, Partisan Rangers

Misc
 Adair's Company (Lodi Company) 
 Adam's Company (Holmes County Independent) 
 Applewhite's Company (Vaiden Guards) 
 Barnes' Company of Home Guards 
 Barr's Company
 Brown's Company (Foster Creek Rangers), Cavalry
 Burt's Independent Company (Dixie Guards) 
 Camp Guard (Camp of Instruction for Conscripts) 
 Clayton's Company (Jasper Defenders) 
 Conscripts, Mississippi
 Drane's Company (Choctaw County Reserves), Cavalry 
 Drane's Company (Choctaw Silver Greys)
 Fant's Company 
 Foote's Company, Mounted Men 
 Gage's Company 
 Gage's Company (Wigfall Guards)
 Gordon's Company (Local Guard of Wilkinson County) 
 Grave's Company (Copiah Horse Guards)
 Griffin's Company (Madison Guards) 
 Hall's Company 
 Henley's Company (Henley's Invincibles) 
 Hightower's Company 
 Hudson's Company (Noxubee Guards)
 Maxey's Company, Mounted Infantry (State Troops)
 McCord's Company (Slate Springs Company) 
 McLelland's Company (Noxubee Home Guards)
 Miscellaneous, Mississippi (Mississippi)
 Montgomery's Company of Scouts 
 Montgomery's Independent Company (State Troops) (Herndon Rangers) 
 Montgomery's Company 
 Moore's Company (Palo Alto Guards) 
 Morgan's Company (Morgan Riflemen) 
 Morphis' Independent Company of Scouts 
 Moseley's Regiment 
 Nash's Company (Leake Rangers) 
 Packer's Company (Pope Guards) 
 Page's Company (Lexington Guards)
 Roach's Company (Tippah Scouts)
 Roger's Company
 Shield's Company
 Standefer's Company
 Stewart's Company (Yalobusha Rangers)
 Taylor's Company (Boomerangs) 
 Terrell's Unattached Company, Cavalry 
 Terry's Company
 Walsh's Company (Muckalusha Guards) 
 Wilkinson County Minute Men 
 Williams' Company (Gray Port Greys) 
 William's Company 
 Wilson's Company (Ponticola Guards) 
 Wilson's Independent Company, Mounted Men (Neshoba Rangers) 
 Withers' Company, Reserve Corps

State Troops
 Blythe's Battalion (State Troops) 
 Gillenland's Battalion (State Troops)
 Grace's Company (State Troops)
 Maxwell's Company (State Troops) (Peach Creek Rangers)
 Patton's Company (State Troops) 
 Perrin's Battalion, State Cavalry
 Red's Company (State Troops)
 Stricklin's Company (State Troops)
 Yerger's Company (State Troops)

See also
Lists of American Civil War Regiments by State
11th Mississippi Infantry Monument

Notes

References
 

Mississippi
 
Civil War